The Olympus Tough TG-6 is a weatherised digital compact camera announced by Olympus Corporation on May 22, 2019. It differs from its predecessor, the Olympus Tough TG-5, by including new underwater modes, more macro photo options as well as a monitor with improved resolution.

The TG-6 is technically very similar to the Olympus TG-4 and TG-5. The physical dimensions (length x width x depth) of the TG-4, TG-5 and the TG-6 are identical.

References
https://www.olympus.co.uk/site/en/c/cameras/tough/tough_cameras/tg_6/index.html

External links 
 

Olympus digital cameras
Cameras introduced in 2019